Nakulugamuwa is a village in the Hambantota District, Southern Province, Sri Lanka, Sri Lanka. It is located on the Tangalla Road (A2 Highway).

Nakulugamuwa is a comparatively highly populated village in Tangalle. Churches, Buddhist temples, Hindu temples, mosques, schools of various types and many private shops and establishments are spread throughout the area. Though it is a majority Roman Catholic and Buddhist area, people of many faiths live here in peaceful coexistence. A sizable population also exists of minority Tamils and a smaller percentage of Muslims. There has been no record of any violence used by one faith group or racial group against another.

A railway station for Nakulugamuwa was opened on 4 September 2022.

Landmarks and notable places

Educational establishments
Nakulugamuwa Gamini Maha Vidyalaya
Nakulugamuwa Primary School
Rambukketiya Maha Vidyalaya

Medical establishments
Polycare Private Medical Center
Nakulugamuwa Divisional Hospital

Religious establishments
Rambukketiya Viharaya
Wallawatta Jayatilakaramaya
Sri Vimalananda Dhaham Pasala
Wewdatta Temple

Public places
Nakulugamuwa Railway Station
Miriswatta Water Tank
Nakulugamuwa Post Office

References

Populated places in Hambantota District